Green Language is the second studio album by Glaswegian producer Russell Whyte under the alias Rustie. The album, released on Warp on August 25, 2014, was announced with the track "Raptor" - first played by Annie Mac on BBC Radio 1 in June 2014. It features guest appearances from D Double E, Danny Brown, Gorgeous Children, and Redinho. The title of the album derives from "the language of the birds".

Production
Reflecting on Glass Swords in 2014, Whyte stated that he felt that he "“went kind of quite crazy on Glass Swords" and that he was "taking the piss with kitsch sounds and over-the-top silliness." Whyte stated that he wanted his next album Green Language to be different and "more serious". In between the release of Glass Swords and Green Language, Whyte scrapped an entire album's worth of material that he stated "didn't feel right as an album."

Release
Green Language was released on August 25, 2014.

Reception

At Metacritic, which assigns a normalised rating out of 100 to reviews from mainstream critics, the album has received an average score of 69, indicating "generally favorable reviews", based on 25 reviews.

Tshepo Mokoena of The Guardian gave the album a rating of 4 stars out of 5, calling it "an exercise in variety that pushes the boundaries of what a synth-driven album can, and should, sound like". Stephen Carlick of Exclaim! opined that "There are great tracks on Green Language, but a lack of consistency stops it from being a great album."

Tom Lea of Fact commented on the album in 2015 that the album "divided listeners". Whyte tweeted that he felt the Green Language was "too A&Red", later explaining that his managers were "trying to push me in one way, in kind of an avant garde, arty route, then I had other people trying to get me to do big singles, the vocal stuff and all that. I was getting pulled in two directions, which I think you can tell a little bit on the album."

Complex named the cover of Green Language as one of the 30 best album covers of 2014, while Pitchfork named it as one of the 20 best album covers of 2014.

Track listing

Personnel
 Rustie – engineer, producer
 Joe LaPorta – mastering

Charts

See also
 2014 in music

References

External links
 

2014 albums
Warp (record label) albums
Rustie albums